Moradabad district is one of the districts of Uttar Pradesh, India. Moradabad is the district headquarters. Moradabad district is a part of Moradabad division. It is used to be the second most populous district of Uttar Pradesh (out of 75), after Prayagraj till a new district Sambhal was carved out of it in 2011.

The district of Moradabad lies between 28°21´ to 28°16´ north latitude and 78°4´ to 79° east longitude.

Demographics

According to the 2011 census Moradabad district has a population of 4,772,006, roughly equal to the nation of Singapore or the US state of Alabama. This gives it a ranking of 26th in India (out of a total of 640). Its population growth rate over the decade 2001-2011 was  25.25%.

The residual Moradabad district has a population of 3,126,507. Moradabad has a sex ratio of  903 females for every 1000 males, and a literacy rate of 58.67%. Scheduled Castes make up 436,149 (13.95%) of the population.

Religion

After the separation of Sambhal district, Moradabad district became the second Muslim-majority district after Rampur.

Language

At the time of the 2011 Census of India, 84.49% of the population of the district spoke Hindi and 15.20% Urdu as their first language.

Administrative divisions
There is one Lok Sabha constituencies for the district:
 Moradabad composed of Kanth, Thakurdwara, Moradabad Rural, Moradabad City and Barhapur (from Bijnor District).

For election purposes Moradabad District is divided into six Vidhan Sabha constituencies:
 Kanth
 Thakurdwara
 Moradabad Rural
 Moradabad Nagar
 Kundarki
 Bilari

Moradabad District has one division: Moradabad Subdivision. There are five tehsils in Moradabad District and eight blocks.
In Moradabad Subdivision there are three tehsils: Bilari Tehsil, Kanth Tehsil, Thakurdwara Tehsil; and there are five blocks: Kundarki, Chajlet, Bhagtpur, Dilari and Mundapandey.

Towns and villages
In addition to the city of Moradabad, which is governed as a Municipal Corporation, there are four municipalities:  Bahjoi, Bilari, Chandausi, and Thakurdwara.  There are six Town Panchayats:
 Bhojpur Dharampur
 Kanth
 Kundarki
 Narauli
 Rustamnagar Sahaspur
 Umri Kalan
 Sherua Dharampur

There are 1210 grams and 584 gram panchayats in the district.

Villages
Amarpurkashi
Handalpur

Notable people 

Jigar Moradabadi
Piyush Chawla
Ponty Chadha
Robert Vadra
Sufi Amba Prasad
Arun Lal
Govind Swarup
Javed Jaffrey
Zainul Abideen

See also
Bhikanpur, Moradabad
1888 Moradabad hailstorm

References

External links 

 

 
Districts of Uttar Pradesh